William Hugh Chisholm (June 28, 1909 – November 7, 1996) was an American racewalker. He competed in the men's 50 kilometres walk at the 1932 Summer Olympics.

References

External links
 

1909 births
1996 deaths
Athletes (track and field) at the 1932 Summer Olympics
American male racewalkers
Olympic track and field athletes of the United States
Place of birth missing